Essex Boys is a 2000 British crime film. It was directed by Terry Winsor and stars Sean Bean, Alex Kingston, Tom Wilkinson, Charlie Creed-Miles and Holly Davidson.

Plot
The film is based loosely around events in December 1995 that culminated in the Rettendon murders of three drug dealers in Rettendon, Essex, UK.

Cast
 Charlie Creed-Miles as Billy Reynolds/narrator
 Sean Bean as Jason Locke
 Gareth Milne as Chippy
 Alex Kingston as Lisa Locke
 Amelia Lowdell as Nicole
 Larry Lamb as Peter Chase
 Michael McKell as Wayne Lovell
 Holly Davidson as Suzy Welch
 Terence Rigby as Henry Hobbs
 Tom Wilkinson as John Dyke
 Billy Murray as Perry Elley
 George Jackos as Kiri Christos
 Sally Hurst as Beverley
 Louise Landon as Jemma
 Gary Love as Detective
 Rachel Darling as Club dancer
 Trevor Kirton as Man on street #1
 Carl Smith as Man on street #2

Locations
The film was shot on location around Essex. In particular Southend on Sea, Jaywick in Clacton and the Dartford Crossing, where the gang travels from Kent to Essex.

Reception
The film met with generally negative critical reviews, maintaining a 17% rating at Rotten Tomatoes. The viewer ratings have generally been more positive.

Similar films
The films Rise of the Footsoldier (2007), Bonded by Blood (2010),  The Fall of the Essex Boys (2013) Essex Boys Retribution (2013) and Essex Boys Law of Survival (2015) are also based – to varying degrees – on the Rettendon murders.

References

External links
 
 The Hit (2016)
 
 Essex Boys on Rotten Tomatoes
 

2000 films
2000 action thriller films
British crime films
Films set in Essex
British independent films
Films shot in Kent
Films scored by Colin Towns
2000s English-language films
Films directed by Terry Winsor
2000s British films